Daniel Bacheler, also variously spelt Bachiler, Batchiler or Batchelar, (baptized 16 March 1572 – buried 29 January 1619) was an English lutenist and composer. Of all the English lutenist-composers, he is now credited as probably being the most successful in his own lifetime.

Bacheler was born in the Buckinghamshire village of Aston Clinton, a son of Richard Bachelor and his wife Elizabeth (née Cardell). He served an apprenticeship with his uncle, Thomas Cardell, who was a lutenist and dancing-master in the court of Queen Elizabeth I.

He worked for Sir Francis Walsingham, Robert Devereux, 2nd Earl of Essex, and finally as a groom of the privy chamber for Queen Anne of Denmark, consort of James I.

At the royal court he composed some fifty lute pieces. These included a number of pavans, galliards, almaines and fantasies, including a set of variations on the popular tune "Monsieurs Almaine". Elizabeth Roche, reviewing a CD of his work for The Daily Telegraph commented on the current neglect of Bacheler's music, suggesting that one reason is the "difficulty of his ornamental style, including arpeggios, trills, and even the dazzling tremolos that conclude his variations on Monsieurs Almaine".

The Heralds Visitation records show that Bacheler received a grant of arms in 1606.

He was buried on 29 January 1618/1619 in St Margaret's churchyard, Lee, Kent.

Bibliography
Bacheler, Daniel, Selected works for lute / Daniel Bacheler ; edited and transcribed by Martin Long, London: Oxford University Press, 1972.  
Long, Martin., The music of Daniel Bacheler: a critical study, University of Sydney, 1969.
Batchelor, A: 'Daniel Bacheler: The Right Perfect Musician', The Lute, 28 (1988), 3–12

References

External links

classicguitare, scores and Bio

Renaissance composers
English Baroque composers
English classical composers
Composers for lute
English lutenists
16th-century English composers
17th-century English composers
16th-century English musicians
17th-century English musicians
1572 births
1619 deaths
17th-century classical composers
English male classical composers
People from Buckinghamshire (before 1974)
17th-century male musicians
Household of Anne of Denmark